The Hitchin functional is a mathematical concept with applications in string theory that was introduced by the British mathematician Nigel Hitchin.  and  are the original articles of the Hitchin functional.

As with Hitchin's introduction of generalized complex manifolds, this is an example of a mathematical tool found useful in mathematical physics.

Formal definition 
This is the definition for 6-manifolds. The definition in Hitchin's article is more general, but more abstract.

Let  be a compact, oriented 6-manifold with trivial canonical bundle. Then the Hitchin functional is a functional on 3-forms defined by the formula:

 

where  is a 3-form and * denotes the Hodge star operator.

Properties 
 The Hitchin functional is analogous for six-manifold to the Yang-Mills functional for the four-manifolds.
 The Hitchin functional is manifestly invariant under the action of the group of orientation-preserving diffeomorphisms.
 Theorem.

The power of this concept is in the converse statement: if the exact form  is known, we only have to look at its critical points to find the possible complex structures.

Stable forms 

If an m-form  can be written with local coordinates

and
,
then  defines symplectic structure.

A p-form  is stable if it lies in an open orbit of the local  action where n=dim(M), namely if any small perturbation  can be undone by a local  action. So any 1-form that don't vanish everywhere is stable; 2-form (or p-form when p is even) stability is equivalent to non-degeneracy.

What about p=3? But there are some very lucky exceptional case, namely, when dim , dim . Let  be a stable real 3-form in dimension 6.

Given the stable :
.
We can define another real 3-from
.

Furthermore, it becomes to be the complex structure just if  i.e. 
This  is just the 3-form  in formal definition of Hitchin functional. These idea induces the generalized complex structure.

Use in string theory 
Hitchin functionals arise in many areas of string theory. An example is the compactifications of the 10-dimensional string with a subsequent orientifold projection  using an involution . In this case,  is the internal 6 (real) dimensional Calabi-Yau space. The couplings to the complexified Kähler coordinates  is given by

 

The potential function is the functional , where J is the almost complex structure. Both are Hitchin functionals.

As application to string theory, the famous OSV conjecture  used Hitchin functional in order to relate topological string to 4-dimensional black hole entropy. Using similar technique in the  holonomy  argued about topological M-theory and in the  holonomy topological F-theory might be argued.

More recently, E. Witten claimed the mysterious superconformal field theory in six dimensions, called 6D (2,0) superconformal field theory . Hitchin functional gives one of the bases of it.

Notes

References 

Complex manifolds
String theory